Dominican Republic–Turkey relations are foreign relations between Dominican Republic and Turkey. Dominican Republic has an embassy in Ankara since August 31, 2019. Turkey has an embassy in Santo Domingo since October 1, 2013.

History

Located in the strategically important and volatile Caribbean, having friendly foreign relations with the Dominican Republic has always been very important with various outside actors. In the nineteenth century, the principal outside actors were Spain, France, and Britain; toward the end of the century, Germany, Turkey and the United States also became influential in Dominican affairs.

When President of the Dominican Republic Fernández assumed office in August 1996, he made foreign policy and International relations an important priority, and has engaged Turkey by acting as a bridge between the Caribbean and Central America.

Since the 2010s, due to increased Turkish aid and the increasingly larger number of Turks who vacation in the country, the economic importance of Turkey has grown.

Official Visits

Economic Relations

Trade volume between the two countries was US$132.7 million in 2019 (Turkish exports/imports: 118.6/14.1 million USD).

See also 

 Foreign relations of the Dominican Republic
 Foreign relations of Turkey

References 

 
Turkey
Bilateral relations of Turkey